Hambidge  is a surname.  

Hambidge may also refer to.

Australia
Hambidge, South Australia, a locality
Hambidge Wilderness Protection Area, a protected area in South Australia which was preceded by the  Hambidge Conservation Park and then by the Hambidge National Park 
Hundred of Hambidge, a cadastral unit in South Australia

United States
Hambidge Center Historic District,  a historic district in Georgia